The Walter McDonald Sanders House is a historic house that forms the center of the Sanders House Center complex at Bluefield in Tazewell County, Virginia, United States. It was built between 1894 and 1896, and is a large two-story, three-bay, red brick Queen Anne style dwelling. A two-story, brick over frame addition was built in 1911.  The house features a highly decorative, almost full-length, shed-roofed front porch; a pyramidal roof; and a corner turret with conical roof.  Also on the property are the contributing limestone spring house, a frame smokehouse which contains a railroad museum, a frame granary, and an early-20th century small frame dwelling known as the Rosie Trigg Cottage, which houses the Tazewell County Visitor Center.

The house was listed on the National Register of Historic Places in 2002.

References

External links
Virginia is For Lovers Travel Guide
Visit Tazewell County - includes listing for Sanders House

Historic house museums in Virginia
Houses on the National Register of Historic Places in Virginia
Queen Anne architecture in Virginia
Houses completed in 1894
Houses in Tazewell County, Virginia
National Register of Historic Places in Tazewell County, Virginia
Museums in Tazewell County, Virginia